Steve E. Massengill (born November 21, 1966) is an American Republican politician. Since 2012 he serves as member of the Mississippi House of Representatives from the 13th District.

References

External links
 Steve Massengill at Vote Smart

1966 births
Living people
Republican Party members of the Mississippi House of Representatives
21st-century American politicians